Mattias Nørstebø (born June 3, 1995) is a Norwegian professional ice hockey defenseman. He is currently playing for IF Björklöven in the HockeyAllsvenskan (Allsv).

Playing career
He made his Elitserien debut playing with Brynäs IF during the 2012–13 Elitserien season. After five seasons within Brynäs IF, Nørstebø left out of contract to sign a two-year deal for SHL rivals, Frölunda HC, on March 31, 2016.

After three seasons within Frölunda HC, Nørstebø left as a free agent following the 2018–19 campaign. He signed a one-year contract in the Allsvenskan, returning to former loan club Mora IK on a one-year contract on 26 July 2019.

Career statistics

Regular season and playoffs

International

Awards and honors

References

External links

1995 births
Living people
IF Björklöven players
Brynäs IF players
Frölunda HC players
HV71 players
Mora IK players
Norwegian ice hockey defencemen
Sportspeople from Trondheim
Ice hockey players at the 2018 Winter Olympics
Olympic ice hockey players of Norway